The Excalibur Kid is a 1999 TV movie.

Synopsis
Zack doesn't have your ordinary adolescent problems. Transported back in time to medieval England, he lands in the middle of a vicious battle between an evil witch and Merlin, the master sorcerer, for control of Arthur's kingdom. It's up to Zack to help Merlin and Arthur reclaim the magic sword Excalibur and return Arthur to his rightful place on the throne.

Cast
Jason McSkimming as Zack
François Klanfer as Merlin
Mac Fyfe as Arthur
Francesca Scorsone as Morgause
Natalie Ester as Gwyneth
Serban Celea as Sir Ector
Theodor Danetti as Old Man at Court
George Duta as Jeffy
Camelia Maxim as Gail
Claudiu Trandafir as Jim
Constantin Draganescu as Old Man with Cart
Iulia Boros as Innkeeper
Adrian Ciobanu as King Carados
Vitalie Bantas as Dolt 1
Marcel Cobzariu as Dolt 24
Mihnea Trusca as Kay
Marius Florea Vizante as Cassian
Liviu Timus as Nasty Man
Constantin Florescu as King Bans
Razvan Popa as Duke of St. Ives
Felix Totolici as Courtier 1 (figuration role)
Vlad Jipa as Courtier 3 (figuration role)

External links

1999 television films
1999 films
1999 fantasy films
Arthurian films
English-language Canadian films
Films about time travel
American television films
Canadian television films
1990s English-language films
1990s Canadian films